Charles Louis de Saulces de Freycinet (14 November 1828 – 14 May 1923) was a French statesman and four times Prime Minister during the Third Republic. He also served an important term as Minister of War (1888–1893). He belonged to the Opportunist Republicans faction.

He was elected a member of the Academy of Sciences, and in 1890, the fourteenth member to occupy a seat in the Académie Française.

Biography

Early years
Freycinet was born at Foix (Ariège) of a Protestant family and was the nephew of Louis de Freycinet, a French navigator. Charles Freycinet was educated at the École Polytechnique. He entered government service as a mining engineer (see X-Mines). In 1858 he was appointed traffic manager to the Compagnie de chemins de fer du Midi, a post in which he showed a remarkable talent for organization, and in 1862 returned to the engineering service, attaining in 1886 the rank of inspector-general. He was sent on several special scientific missions, including one to the United Kingdom, on which he wrote  (1867).

Government service

Franco-Prussian War
In July 1870 the Franco-Prussian War started which led to the fall of the Second French Empire of Napoleon III. On the establishment of the Third Republic in September 1870, he offered his services to Léon Gambetta, was appointed prefect of the department of Tarn-et-Garonne, and in October became chief of the military cabinet. It was mainly Freycinet's powers of organization which enabled Gambetta to raise army after army to oppose the invading Germans. He revealed himself to be a competent strategist, but the policy of dictating operations to the generals in the field was not attended with happy results. The friction between him and General d'Aurelle de Paladines resulted in the loss of the advantage temporarily gained at Coulmiers and Orléans, and he was responsible for the campaign in the east, which ended in the destruction of the Armée de l'Est of Charles Denis Bourbaki.

1871-1888
He entered the Senate in 1876 as a follower of Gambetta, and in December 1877 became Minister of Public Works in the cabinet of Jules Armand Stanislaus Dufaure. He passed a great scheme for the gradual acquisition of the railways by the state and the construction of new lines at a cost of three milliards of francs, and for the development of the canal system at a further cost of one milliard. He retained his post in the ministry of William Henry Waddington, whom he succeeded in December 1879 as Prime Minister and Minister for Foreign Affairs. He passed an amnesty for the Communards, but in attempting to steer a middle course (between the Catholics and the anti-clericalists) on the question of the religious associations, he lost Gambetta's support, and resigned in September 1880.

In January 1882 he again became Prime Minister and Foreign Minister. The reluctance of the French parliament to join Britain in the bombardment of Alexandria was the death-knell of French influence in Egypt. He attempted to compromise by occupying the Isthmus of Suez, but the vote of credit was rejected in the Chamber by 417 votes to 75, and the ministry resigned. He returned to office in April 1885 as Foreign Minister in Henri Brisson's cabinet, and retained that post when, in January 1886, he succeeded to the premiership.

He came to power with an ambitious programme of internal reform; but apart from settling the question of the exiled pretenders, his successes were chiefly in the sphere of colonial extension. In spite of his unrivalled skill as a parliamentary tactician, he failed to keep his party together, and was defeated on 3 December 1886. In the following year, after two unsuccessful attempts to construct new ministries, he stood for the Presidency of the Republic; but the radicals, to whom his opportunism was distasteful, turned the scale against him by transferring their votes to Marie François Sadi Carnot.

Minister of War
In April 1888 he became Minister of War in Charles Floquet's cabinet – the first civilian since 1848 to hold that office. His services to France in this capacity were the crowning achievement of his life, and he enjoyed the conspicuous honour of holding his office without a break for five years through as many successive administrations – those of Floquet and Pierre Tirard, his own fourth ministry (March 1890 – February 1892), and the Émile Loubet and Alexandre Ribot ministries. The introduction of the three-years' service and the establishment of a general staff, a supreme council of war, and the army commands were all due to him. His premiership was marked by heated debates on the clerical question, and it was a hostile vote on his bill against the religious associations that caused the fall of his cabinet. He failed to clear himself entirely of complicity in the Panama scandals, and in January 1893 resigned the Ministry of War.

In November 1898 he once again became Minister of War in the Charles Dupuy cabinet, but resigned office on 6 May 1899.

Prime Minister of France

1st Ministry
 Charles de Freycinet – President of the Council and Minister of Foreign Affairs
 Jean Joseph Frédéric Farre – Minister of War
 Charles Lepère – Minister of the Interior and Worship
 Pierre Magnin – Minister of Finance
 Jules Cazot – Minister of Justice
 Jean Bernard Jauréguiberry – Minister of Marine and Colonies
 Jules Ferry – Minister of Public Instruction and Fine Arts
 Henri Varroy – Minister of Public Works
 Adolphe Cochery – Minister of Posts and Telegraphs
 Pierre Tirard – Minister of Agriculture and Commerce

 Changes
 17 May 1880 – Ernest Constans succeeds Lepère as Minister of the Interior and Worship.

2nd Ministry
 Charles de Freycinet – President of the Council and Minister of Foreign Affairs
 Jean-Baptiste Billot – Minister of War
 René Goblet – Minister of the Interior
 Léon Say – Minister of Finance
 Gustave Humbert – Minister of Justice and Worship
 Jean Bernard Jauréguiberry – Minister of Marine and Colonies
 Jules Ferry – Minister of Public Instruction and Fine Arts
 François de Mahy – Minister of Agriculture
 Henri Varroy – Minister of Public Works
 Adolphe Cochery – Minister of Posts and Telegraphs
 Pierre Tirard – Minister of Commerce

3rd Ministry
 Charles de Freycinet – President of the Council and Minister of Foreign Affairs
 Georges Boulanger – Minister of War
 Ferdinand Sarrien – Minister of the Interior
 Marie François Sadi Carnot – Minister of Finance
 Charles Demôle – Minister of Justice
 Théophile Aube – Minister of Marine and Colonies
 René Goblet – Minister of Public Instruction, Fine Arts, and Worship
 Jules Develle – Minister of Agriculture
 Charles Baïhaut – Minister of Public Works
 Félix Granet – Minister of Posts and Telegraphs
 Édouard Locroy – Minister of Commerce and Industry

 Changes
 4 November 1886 – Édouard Millaud succeeds Baïhaut as Minister of Public Works

4th Ministry
 Charles de Freycinet – President of the Council and Minister of War
 Alexandre Ribot – Minister of Foreign Affairs
 Ernest Constans – Minister of the Interior
 Maurice Rouvier – Minister of Finance
 Armand Fallières – Minister of Justice and Worship
 Jules Roche – Minister of the Colonies and of Commerce and Industry
 Édouard Barbey – Minister of Marine
 Léon Bourgeois – Minister of Public Instruction and Fine Arts
 Jules Develle – Minister of Agriculture
 Yves Guyot – Minister of Public Works

Publications
  (1858)
  (1860, revised ed., 1881)
  (1861)
  (1869)
  (1870)
  (1870)
  (1896)
  (1905)
 Contemporain: 'Pensées'' contributed under the pseudonym of Alceste"

References

External links

 

École Polytechnique alumni
Mines Paris - PSL alumni
Corps des mines
1828 births
1923 deaths
Burials at Passy Cemetery
People from Foix
French Protestants
Members of the Académie Française
Politicians of the French Third Republic
Prime Ministers of France
Officiers of the Légion d'honneur
Prefects of France
Prefects of Tarn-et-Garonne
French Ministers of War
19th-century Protestants
20th-century Protestants
Senators of Seine (department)